Kutumbam in some South Indian languages means Family.

 Manchi Kutumbam is a 1965 Telugu film directed by V. Madhusudan Rao.
 Ummadi Kutumbam is a 1967 Telugu film directed by D. Yoganand.

See also
 Kutumba Rao (disambiguation) is an Indian personal name.